Menemenspor, formerly Menemen Belediyespor, is a Turkish professional football club located in the Menemen district of İzmir that competes in TFF Second League. The club colours are blue and yellow and they play their home matches at Menemen İlçe Stadium.

Players

Current squad

Other players under contract

Out on loan

External links
Official website
Menemenspor on TFF.org
Facebook Fans Page

Sports teams in İzmir
Football clubs in Turkey
1942 establishments in Turkey